Ran Nakash (born 1978 is an Israeli professional boxer. He is currently Chief Commander and Head Instructor of the Israel Defense Forces Krav Maga Instructional Division and holds a professional boxing record of 26 wins with 18 by knockout and one loss. He scored his latest victory on January 21, 2012 defeating Derek Bryant by unanimous decision. His only loss to date occurred on April 2, 2011 against WBO Cruiserweight champion Marco Huck. Despite accepting the fight on short notice as a late replacement for Giacobbe Fragomeni, Nakash fought a competitive fight, pressing his opponent throughout the 12-round bout, though Huck was ultimately awarded the victory on points.

Nakash was featured on the Discovery Channel’s Fight Quest where he demonstrated the techniques of the Israeli martial art of Krav Maga.

Professional boxing record

|-
| style="text-align:center;" colspan="8"|26 Wins (18 knockouts, 8 decisions) 1 Loss (1 decision) 
|-  style="text-align:center; background:#e3e3e3;"
|  style="border-style:none none solid solid; "|Result
|  style="border-style:none none solid solid; "|Record
|  style="border-style:none none solid solid; "|Opponent
|  style="border-style:none none solid solid; "|Type
|  style="border-style:none none solid solid; "|Round
|  style="border-style:none none solid solid; "|Date
|  style="border-style:none none solid solid; "|Location
|  style="border-style:none none solid solid; "|Notes
|- align=center
|Win
|26–1
|align=left| Derek Bryant
|UD
|8
|January 21, 2012
|align=left| Roseland Ballroom, New York City
|align=left|
|-
|Loss
|25–1
|align=left| Marco Huck
|UD
|12
|02/04/2011
|align=left| Gerry Weber Stadion, Halle, North Rhine-Westphalia
|align=left|
|-
|Win
|25–0
|align=left| Victor Barragan
|UD
|10
|July 14, 2010
|align=left| Asylum Arena, Philadelphia, Pennsylvania
|align=left|
|-
|Win
|24–0
|align=left| Danny Sheehan
|TKO
|3
|April 29, 2010
|align=left| Nokia Arena, Tel Aviv
|align=left|
|-
|Win
|23–0
|align=left| Richard Stewart
|TKO
|7
|03/04/2010
|align=left| Norfolk Scope, Norfolk, Virginia
|align=left|
|-
|Win
|22–0
|align=left| Attila Makula
|KO
|2
|January 18, 2010
|align=left| Hangar 11, Tel Aviv
|align=left|
|-
|Win
|21–0
|align=left| Gary Gomez
|UD
|8
|02/10/2009
|align=left| The Blue Horizon, Philadelphia, Pennsylvania
|align=left|
|-
|Win
|20–0
|align=left| Yavor Marinchev
|PTS
|10
|August 8, 2009
|align=left| Aviv Sport Hall, Ra'anana
|align=left|
|-
|Win
|19–0
|align=left| William Bailey
|TKO
|4
|11/07/2009
|align=left| Prudential Center, Newark, New Jersey
|align=left|
|-
|Win
|18–0
|align=left| Dave Brunelli
|TKO
|7
|03/04/2009
|align=left| The Blue Horizon, Philadelphia, Pennsylvania
|align=left|
|-
|Win
|17–0
|align=left| Ryan Carrol
|KO
|2
|06/02/2009
|align=left| The Blue Horizon, Philadelphia, Pennsylvania
|align=left|
|-
|Win
|16–0
|align=left| Harvey Jolly
|TKO
|7
|05/12/2008
|align=left| The Blue Horizon, Philadelphia, Pennsylvania
|align=left|
|-
|Win
|15–0
|align=left| Larry Robinson
|TKO
|1
|12/09/2008
|align=left| The Blue Horizon, Philadelphia, Pennsylvania
|align=left|
|-
|Win
|14–0
|align=left| Martin Haag
|TKO
|4
|July 20, 2008
|align=left| Bulldog Open Air Arena, Karlsruhe, Baden-Württemberg
|align=left|
|-
|Win
|13–0
|align=left| James Porter
|TKO
|2
|June 6, 2008
|align=left| The Blue Horizon, Philadelphia, Pennsylvania
|align=left|
|-
|Win
|12–0
|align=left| Asmir Vojnovic
|TKO
|7
|01/03/2008
|align=left| Aviv Sport Hall, Ra'anana
|align=left|
|-
|Win
|11–0
|align=left| Ray Ruiz
|TKO
|2
|08/02/2008
|align=left| The Blue Horizon, Philadelphia, Pennsylvania
|align=left|
|-
|Win
|10–0
|align=left|Ibrahim Hariri
|KO
|?
|October 27, 2007
|align=left| Aviv Sport Hall, Ra'anana
|align=left|
|-
|Win
|9–0
|align=left| Samuel Lee Brown
|UD
|4
|07/09/2007
|align=left| The Blue Horizon, Philadelphia, Pennsylvania
|align=left|
|-
|Win
|8–0
|align=left|Machmud Hashb
|KO
|2
|April 28, 2007
|align=left| Aviv Sport Hall, Ra'anana
|align=left|
|-
|Win
|7–0
|align=left| Robert Murray
|UD
|4
|09/02/2007
|align=left| The Blue Horizon, Philadelphia, Pennsylvania
|align=left|
|-
|Win
|6–0
|align=left|Machmud Hashb
|TKO
|1
|January 31, 2007
|align=left| CMA Gym, Tel Aviv
|align=left|
|-
|Win
|5–0
|align=left| Georgi Buhov
|PTS
|4
|06/01/2007
|align=left| Sofia
|align=left|
|-
|Win
|4–0
|align=left|Elia Ivanov
|TKO
|2
|November 25, 2006
|align=left| Aviv Sport Hall, Ra'anana
|align=left|
|-
|Win
|3–0
|align=left| Gary Lavender
|UD
|4
|October 13, 2006
|align=left| The Blue Horizon, Philadelphia, Pennsylvania
|align=left|
|-
|Win
|2–0
|align=left|Muhamad Taya
|TKO
|2
|June 30, 2006
|align=left| Aviv Sport Hall, Ra'anana
|align=left|
|-
|Win
|1–0
|align=left|Elia Ivanov
|TKO
|3
|June 18, 2006
|align=left| CMA Gym, Tel Aviv
|align=left|
|}

References

Israeli Jews
Jewish boxers
Krav Maga practitioners
Living people
1978 births
Israeli male boxers
Cruiserweight boxers